A gonophore is a reproductive organ in Hydrozoa that produces gametes. It is a sporosac, a medusa or any intermediate stage.

Gonophores are borne on branching stalks that grow out as a ring from the hydranth (i.e. the hydroid polyp, bearing a mouth, digestive cavity and tentacles) wall. The germ cells are formed from the inner layer of the entocodon. The entocodon is the primordium (i.e. the first cells that give rise to the development of an organ) of the subumbrella (i.e. the concave oral surface of a medusa) in the development of medusae from the gonophore.

The gonophores in the order Leptomedusae are borne on much reduced hydranths and are usually protected in a peridermal (i.e. belonging to a hydroid perisarc) gonotheca. Medusae forming on fully developed hydranths are extremely rare; usually the gonophores develop into medusae or into sessile sporosacs.

The gonophores in the superfamily Plumularioidea are usually fixed sporosacs (i.e. gonophores held in place and not released into the water during larval development), more rarely they are rather reduced medusoids.

The gonophores in the family Lovenellidae are pedunculate free-roaming medusae.

The gonophores in the family Haleciidae are typically sporosacs, growing singly or bunched into a glomulus. They remain attached to the hydroids or break off to be passively drifted away; in a few, the gonophores are naked.

The gonophores in the family Sphaerocorynidae are borne singly or on short, branching blastostyles (i.e. the living axial portion of a modified gonangium, from which numerous medusae are budded) between or below tentacles. They develop into free medusae or eumedusoids.

The gonophores in the family Corynidae are borne on hydranths and either liberated as free medusae or retained as medusoids or sessile sporosacs.

The gonophores in the family Hydrocorynidae are borne in clusters on proximal part of hydranth body or develop from hydrorhiza (i.e. the stalk of a colony). The gonophores develop into free medusae or sessile sporosacs.

The gonophores in the family Candelabridae are fixed sporosacs. They develop on the aboral part of the hydranth below the tentacle-covered region, either directly on the hydranth or on spindle-shaped blastostyles.

The gonophores in the family Tubulariidae develop above the aboral tentacles and develop into free medusae or fixed sporosacs

The gonophores in the family Corymorphidae are borne above aboral tentacles, either directly issuing from hydranth wall or on blastostyles. The gonophores develop into free medusae or fixed sporosacs.

The gonophores in the family Tricyclusidae are fixed sporosacs, with only male specimens observed.

The gonophores in the family Pennariidae develop above the aboral tentacles. They may or may not liberate eumedusoids.

The gonophores in the family Cladocorynidae are carried singly or on short, branched pedicels on the lower or middle part of the hydranth. They developing into free medusae or fixed sporosacs.

The gonophores in the family Solanderiidae, where known,  arise directly from coenosarc (i.e. the hollow living tubes of the upright branching individuals of a colony). They are cryptomedusoid or eumedusoid.

The gonophores in the family Milleporidae arise from the coenosarc within chambers embedded entirely in the coenosteum (i.e. the calcareous mass forming the skeleton of a compound coral).

See also
 Gonopod
 Gonopodium

References

External links 

  The suborder Capitata

Hydrozoa
Cnidarian anatomy
Animal reproductive system